Sovetsk (Old Prussian: Tilzi;) is a town in Kaliningrad Oblast, Russia, located on the south bank of the Neman River which forms the border with Lithuania.

Geography
Sovetsk lies in the historic region of Lithuania Minor at the confluence of the Tilse and Neman rivers. Panemunė in Lithuania was formerly a suburb of the town; after Germany's defeat in World War I, the trans-Neman suburb was detached from Tilsit (with the rest of the Klaipėda Region) in 1920.

Climate
Sovetsk has a borderline oceanic climate (Cfb in the Köppen climate classification) using the  boundary, or a humid continental climate (Dfb) using the  boundary.

History

Tilsit, which received civic rights from Albert, Duke of Prussia in 1552, developed around a castle of the Teutonic Knights, known as the Schalauer Haus, founded in 1288. In 1454, King Casimir IV Jagiellon incorporated the region to the Kingdom of Poland upon the request of the anti-Teutonic Prussian Confederation. After the subsequent Thirteen Years' War (1454–1466), the settlement was a part of Poland as a fief held by the Teutonic Knights, and thus was located within the Polish–Lithuanian union, later elevated to the Polish–Lithuanian Commonwealth.

In the winter of 1678–1679, during the Scanian War, the town was occupied by Sweden. From the 18th century, it was part of the Kingdom of Prussia. During the Seven Years' War, in 1757–1762, the town was under Russian control. Afterwards it fell back to Prussia, and from 1871 it was also part of Germany.

The Treaties of Tilsit were signed here in July 1807, the preliminaries of which were settled by the emperors Alexander I of Russia and Napoleon I of France on a raft moored in the Neman River. This treaty, which created the Kingdom of Westphalia and the Duchy of Warsaw, completed Napoleon's humiliation of the Kingdom of Prussia, when it was deprived of one half of its dominions. Three days before its signing, the Prussian queen Louise (1776–1810) tried to persuade Napoleon in a private conversation to ease his hard conditions on Prussia; though unsuccessful, Louise's effort endeared her to the Prussian people.

Until 1945, a marble tablet marked the house in which King Frederick William III of Prussia and Queen Louise resided. Also, in the former Schenkendorf Platz was a monument to the poet Max von Schenkendorf (1783–1817), a native of Tilsit; a statue of Lenin was erected in its place in 1967.

During the 19th century when the Lithuanian language in Latin characters was banned within the Russian Empire, Tilsit was an important centre for printing Lithuanian books which then were smuggled by Knygnešiai to the Russian-controlled part of Lithuania. In general, Tilsit thrived and was an important Prussian town. The Geographical Dictionary of the Kingdom of Poland from 1892 referred to the town as the capital of Lithuania Minor. The local Lithuanian population was subjected to Germanisation, which resulted in a decrease in the share of Lithuanians in the town's population. In 1884, Lithuanians formed 13% of the town's population. By 1900 it had electric tramways and 34,500 inhabitants; a direct railway line linked it to Königsberg (Kaliningrad) and Labiau (Polessk) and steamers docked there daily. According to the Prussian census of 1905, the city of Tilsit had a population of 37,148, of which 96% were Germans and 4% were Lithuanians. The bridge was built in 1907 and rebuilt in 1946. The town was occupied by Russian troops between 26 August 1914 and 12 September 1914 during World War I. The Act of Tilsit was signed here by leaders of the Lietuvininks in 1918.

Hitler visited the town just before World War II, and a photo was taken of him on the famous bridge over the Neman River. During the war, expelled Poles from German-occupied Poland were enslaved by the Germans as forced labour in the town's vicinity. Tilsit was occupied by the Red Army on January 20, 1945, and was annexed by the Soviet Union in 1945. The remaining Germans who had not evacuated were subsequently expelled in accordance with the Potsdam Agreement and replaced with Soviet citizens. The town was renamed Sovetsk in honor of Soviet rule.

Modern Sovetsk has sought to take advantage of Tilsit's tradition of cheese production (Tilsit cheese), but the new name ("Sovetsky cheese") has not inherited its predecessor's reputation.

Since the dissolution of the Soviet Union in 1991, there has been some discussion about the possibility of restoring the town's original name. In 2010, the Kaliningrad Oblast's then-governor Georgy Boos of the ruling United Russia Party proposed restoring the original name and combining the town with the Neman and Slavsk Districts to form a new Tilsit District. Boos emphasized that this move would stimulate development and economic growth, but that it could happen only through a referendum. The idea was opposed by the Communist Party of Russia; in particular, Igor Revin, the Kaliningrad Secretary of the Communist Party, accused Boos and United Russia of Germanophilia.

In April 2007, government restrictions on visits to border areas were tightened, and for foreigners, and Russians living outside the border zone, travel to the Sovetsk and Bagrationovsk areas required advance permission from the Border Guard Service (in some cases up to 30 days beforehand). It was alleged that this procedure slowed the development of these potentially thriving border towns. In June 2012, these restrictions were lifted (the only restricted area is the Neman river shoreline), which gave a boost to local and international tourism.

Administrative and municipal status
Within the framework of administrative divisions, it is incorporated as the town of oblast significance of Sovetsk—an administrative unit with the status equal to that of the districts. As a municipal division, the town of oblast significance of Sovetsk is incorporated as Sovetsky Urban Okrug.

Architecture

Many of the town's buildings were destroyed during World War II. However, the old town centre still includes several German buildings, including those of Jugendstil design. The Queen Louise Bridge, now connecting the town to Panemunė in Lithuania, retains an arch – all that is left of a more complex pre-war bridge structure built in 1907. The carved relief portrait of Queen Louise above the arch still exists; however, the German inscription "KÖNIGIN LUISE-BRÜCKE" was removed after the Soviets took over the town.

Historical population

1816: 10,548
1821: 11,248
1880: 21,400
1891: 24,126
1900: 34,539
1910: 39,013
1925: 50,834
1933: 57,286
1939: 59,105
1946: 6,500
1959: 31,941
1989: 41,881
2002: 43,224
2004: 43,300
2010: 41,705

Ethnic composition in 2010:
Russians: 86.7%
Ukrainians: 3.5%
Lithuanians: 3.3%
Belarusians: 2.7%

Twin towns – sister cities

Sovetsk is twinned with:

 Kiel, Germany
 Lidzbark Warmiński, Poland
 Pagėgiai, Lithuania
 Považská Bystrica, Slovakia
 Šilalė, Lithuania
 Tauragė, Lithuania

Former twin towns:
 Bełchatów, Poland
 Iława (rural gmina), Poland

In February and March 2022 respectively, the Polish city of Bełchatów suspended while the Polish Iława County terminated their partnership with Sovetsk as a reaction to the 2022 Russian invasion of Ukraine.

Notable people

Daniel Klein (1609–1666), Lithuanian pastor and grammarian
Johann Christian Jacobi (1719–1784), German oboist
Max von Schenkendorf (1783–1817), German poet and author
Franz Meyen (1804–1840), German botanist
Hans Victor von Unruh (1806–1886), German politician and technician
Wilhelm Voigt (1849–1922), the inspiration for The Captain of Köpenick
Margarete Poehlmann (1856–1923), German educator and politician, first woman to speak in a Prussian parliament
Gustaf Kossinna or Kossina (1858–1931), archaeologist
Johanna Wolff (1858–1943), German author
Max Scherwinsky (1859–1909) German-born architect working mainly in Riga, Latvia
Emil Wiechert (1861–1928), German geophysicist
Raphael Friedeberg (1863–1940), German physician and politician
Max Gülstorff (1882–1947), German actor
Carl Brinkmann (1885–1954), German sociologist and economist
Franz Scheidies (1890–1942) general in the Wehrmacht during WWII 
Walter Weiß (1890–1967), German general during WWII. 
Friedrich Schröder Sonnenstern (1892–1982), Illustrator
Dick Shikat (1897–1968) German professional wrestler and World Heavyweight Champion 
Frank Wisbar (1899–1967) German director
Karl Hermann Martell (1906–1966), German actor
Franz Abromeit (1907–1964), SS officer, Reichssicherheitshauptamt (Judenreferent)
Joachim Sadrozinski (1907–1944), officer and resistance fighter
Erna Dorn (1911–1953) victim of injustice in the German Democratic Republic
Siegfried Graetschus (1916–1943), SS-Oberscharführer, killed during revolt in Sobibor extermination camp
Johannes Bobrowski (1917–1965), German writer
Werner Abrolat (1924–1997), German actor
Gunter Wyszecki (1925–1985), German-Canadian physicist
Armin Mueller-Stahl (born 1930), German actor, honorary citizen since 8 December 2011
Sabine Bethmann (1931-2021), German actress
Jürgen Kurbjuhn (1940–2014), football player
Klaus-Dieter Sieloff (1942–2011), football player
John Kay (born 1944), lead singer of the late 1960s rock band Steppenwolf
Edgar Froese (1944–2015), German founder and leader of the electronic music group Tangerine Dream
Victor Ivrii (born 1949) a Soviet, Canadian mathematician
Andrei Sosnitskiy (born 1962) a Belarusian professional football coach and a former player

Gallery

Popular culture
The town is the location of a scene in Leo Tolstoy's War and Peace (Book Two Part Two Chapter 21).
Tilsit is the setting for part of the 1939 film "The Journey to Tilsit".

References

Notes

Sources

Northern Germany by Karl Baedeker, 14th revised edition, London, 1904, p. 178.

Cities and towns in Kaliningrad Oblast
Castles in Russia
Lithuania–Russia border crossings
1552 establishments in Europe